Aivar Kokk (born 15 April 1960, in Jõgeva) is an Estonian politician. He has been member of the XII, XIII and XIV Riigikogu.

In 1983 he graduated from Tallinn University of Technology in production of construction details and structures.

From 2004 to 2009 he was Jõgeva County Governor.

Since 2011 he is a member of Pro Patria and Res Publica Union/Isamaa Party.

References

1960 births
Isamaa politicians
Living people
Members of the Riigikogu, 2011–2015
Members of the Riigikogu, 2015–2019
Members of the Riigikogu, 2019–2023
Members of the Riigikogu, 2023–2027
People from Jõgeva
Tallinn University of Technology alumni